{{DISPLAYTITLE:C15H20N2O}}
The molecular formula C15H20N2O may refer to:

 Anagyrine
 1-(2-Dimethylaminoethyl)dihydropyrano(3,2-e)indole         |                                                                 
 5-MeO-MALT                                                 |                                                                 
 5-MeO-MPMI
 5-MeO-pyr-T
 Ro60-0213